Taha Can Velioğlu (born 21 February 1994) is a Turkish footballer who plays as a centre back for Fethiyespor. He made his Süper Lig debut for Bursaspor on 19 May 2013 against Gençlerbirliği.

References

External links
 
 
 
 

1994 births
Sportspeople from Adapazarı
Living people
Turkish footballers
Turkey youth international footballers
Association football central defenders
Association football defenders
Bursaspor footballers
Bucaspor footballers
Denizlispor footballers
Manisa FK footballers
Eyüpspor footballers
Fethiyespor footballers
Süper Lig players
TFF First League players
TFF Second League players
TFF Third League players